For the business newspaper based in the United States, see Inside Business (newspaper)

Inside Business was an Australian television program broadcast on ABC1. Making its debut on 4 August 2002, it presented analysis of the financial world, including the Australian sharemarket, business activities and the broader economy. He also conducted interviews with members of the business community, profiled emerging businesses and entrepreneurs, and often presented his own commentary at the end of the program.

The show was criticised by fellow ABC network program Media Watch for providing uncritical promotion of a floral company on its profile segment, a claim which the program denied. The issue is particularly pertinent as the ABC network carries no advertising.
The show was also repeated on weekday mornings at 8:00 am on ABC2

The show was cancelled by the ABC as from the end of the 2013 season, after Kohler announced his retirement from the show due to his wish to lessen his workload.

Episodes

  No episode was broadcast on 20 April 2003 as it was Easter Sunday.
  No episode was broadcast on 12 October 2003 due to a special two-hour edition of Insiders covering the one-year anniversary of the 2002 Bali bombings.
  No episode was broadcast on 11 April 2004 as it was Easter Sunday.
  No episode was broadcast on 25 April 2004 as it was ANZAC Day.
  No episode was broadcast on 27 March 2005 as it was Easter Sunday.
  No episode was broadcast on 16 April 2006 as it was Easter Sunday.
  No episode was broadcast on 8 April 2007 as it was Easter Sunday.

See also
 List of Australian Broadcasting Corporation programs
 List of Australian television series

References

External links
 Official website

Australian non-fiction television series
Australian Broadcasting Corporation original programming
ABC News and Current Affairs
2002 Australian television series debuts
2013 Australian television series endings